Meyer Gate is a 1901 gate on the Harvard University campus, in Cambridge, Massachusetts, United States. The gate has a traditional design and borders the Harvard Yard and The Plaza. It is named after George von Lengerke Meyer.

Inscription
The Meyer gate features a plaque with a quotation by Ralph Waldo Emerson in 1836, which reads:

References

1901 establishments in Massachusetts
Buildings and structures completed in 1901
Gates
Harvard University